Träskaten is a lake of Södermanland, Sweden.

Lakes of Södermanland County